Kulpi is a rural town and locality in the Toowoomba Region, Queensland, Australia.

Geography

The Oakey–Cooyar Road runs through from south to north.

History
The site of the town of Kulpi was part of a selection made by Fred Beckmann from the Rosalie Plains pastoral run. Beckman built two establishments, the Pioneer Hotel and a store which formed the centre of the town. The settlement was originally known as Rosalie, however the name was soon changed to Kulpi, to avoid confusion with the Rosalie Plains Homestead, which was a small town in itself.

The town takes its name from its railway station name assigned to 9 January 1913 by the Queensland Railways Department. It is an  reportedly an Aboriginal word meaning box tree or charred logs.

Kulpi State School opened on 9 August 1915.

Facilities
Library services in Kulpi are provided by the Toowoomba Regional Council's mobile library service. The van visits Kulpi State School on the 1st and 3rd Tuesday of each month.

Education 
Kulpi State School is a government primary (Prep-6) school for boys and girls at 9 Beckman Street. In 2017, the school had an enrolment of 16 students with 3 teachers (1 full-time equivalent) and 6 non-teaching staff (2 full-time equivalent). In 2018, the school had an enrolment of 22 students with 3 teachers (1 full-time equivalent) and 7 non-teaching staff (2 full-time equivalent).

There are no secondary schools in Kulpi. The nearest government secondary schools are Quinalow State School (to Year 10) in neighbouring Quinalow to the north-west and Oakey State High School (to Year 12) in Oakey to the south.

References

Further reading

External links 

 

Towns in Queensland
Toowoomba Region
Localities in Queensland